Daagh is a Pakistani television series directed by Sarmad Khoosat who is known for dealing with social issues. It shows the misery of women that are unable to give birth to a boy.
It was also aired in India on Zindagi TV, premiering on 30 November 2015. The shows ended its run in India on 23 December 2015.

Plot
The story of Daagh drama serial completely revolves around the life of a house wife named Umama (Mehar Bano) who has four daughters. Umama belongs to a middle-class family who lives with her parents and two sisters. Her father has is of a very conservative personality. Umama marries Murad (Fahad Mustafa). Murad also belongs to a middle-class family and lives with his mother and two sisters. Initially Murad's cousin Deeba (Sana Askari) was interested in him and wanted to get married. But he chooses Umama as his life partner. With the passage of time, Umama gave birth to four daughters but her mother-in-law demands a baby boy (for the sake of family name). After the birth of fourth daughter Murrad's mother forces him to marry Deeba. After Murad's second marriage, Deeba wanted Murad to divorce his first wife Umama. Eventually deeba gives birth to twin sons and gains importance in Murad's eyes. Murad starts neglecting Umama and her daughters. Umama after sustaining a lot of insults leaves Murad's house. She is hired by a school and stays in her father's house. It is known afterwards that Murad's sons were having developmental abnormalities. Murad understands his mistakes. Deeba is regretful, too. Murad apologizes to Umama but she refuses to go with him again and lives independently with her daughters.

Cast

Fahad Mustafa as Murad
Mehar Bano as Umama (Murad's wife)
Talha Mufti as Mushtaq (Umama's cousin and fiancé)
Sana Askari as Deeba (Murad's cousin and second wife)
Uroosa Qureshi as Noreen (Murad's sister)
Firdous Jamal as Umama's father
Yasra Rizvi as Rehana (Murad's sister)
Sidra Batool as Umama's sister
Sumbul Shahid as Noor
Shama Askari as Murad's mother

Song 

The OST Song "Yeh Tamam Zindagi Daagh Hai" has been written by Sarwat Nazir. Music by Waqar Ali and sung by Alycia Dias.

Broadcast 

The Drama was broadcast every Friday 8:00 pm on ARY. The entire drama has a total of 24 episodes.

Accolades

References

External links 
Pakistani Tv Serials Portal
ARY Digital Programs

2012 Pakistani television series debuts
2013 Pakistani television series endings
ARY Digital original programming
Pakistani drama television series
Urdu-language television shows